Pascal Elbé (born 13 March 1967) is a French actor, director and screenwriter.

Life and career
Pascal Elbé was born in Colmar, Haut-Rhin, France, to a family of middle-class Jewish immigrants from Algeria. He was raised in Strasbourg. At 18, he moved to Paris to study acting.
In 2004, Elbe was nominated for a César Award for Most Promising Actor.

Elbé was previously married to Beatrice Elbé; they separated in 2014 after twenty-two years together. They have a son together, Leo.

Filmography

References

External links

 

1967 births
French male film actors
French film directors
French male television actors
Living people
People from Colmar
20th-century French Jews
Jewish French male actors
French male screenwriters
French screenwriters